The following lists events that happened in 1921 in Iceland.

Incumbents
Monarch - Kristján X
Prime Minister – Jón Magnússon

Events
1921 Úrvalsdeild

Births
1 January – Ottó Jónsson, footballer
16 March – Þórhallur Einarsson, footballer
7 April – Einar Bragi poet and publisher (d. 2005)
26 May – Hermann Pálsson, scholar and translator (d. 2002)
18 July – Jón Óskar, poet (d. 1998)
15 August – Matthías Bjarnason, politician (d. 2014).

Deaths

28 September – Þorvaldur Thoroddsen, geologist and geographer (b. 1855)

References

 
1920s in Iceland
Iceland
Iceland
Years of the 20th century in Iceland